Bishop Joseph Aind, S.D.B. is an Indian prelate who served as bishop of the Roman Catholic Diocese of Dibrugarh.

Early life 
Joseph was born in Nahorani, Assam, India on 5 November 1945.

Priesthood 
Joseph was ordained a priest for the congregation of the Salesians of Don Bosco on 27 November 1976.

Episcopate 
Joseph Aind was appointed Bishop of Dibrugarh on 11 November 1994 and ordained on 19 March 1995 by Thomas Menamparampil. He is the Chairman of Social Communication Commission in the North Eastern Regions Bishop council. On 15 February 2021 Aind stepped down as bishop of Dibrugarh after reaching the mandatory retirement age of 75, and was replaced by Albert Hemrom.

References

External links 

http://ccbi.in/bishops-of-india/

1945 births
Living people
21st-century Roman Catholic bishops in India
People from Golaghat district
Salesian bishops
20th-century Roman Catholic bishops in India